Las Galeras is a Municipal district in the town Santa Bárbara de Samaná, Samaná province in the northeast coast of Dominican Republic. It is located at the eastern end of the Samaná Peninsula, on the Rincón Bay that is found between Cabrón and Samaná capes.

Las Galeras, in English The Galleys (a galley was a war ship where prisoners and slaves were used to move the ship), because two galleys stayed here during the 16th century.

Population
In the last national census (2002), the population of Las Galeras is included with that of Santa Bárbara de Samaná.

There are approximately 6,000 people living in the area of Las Galeras.

The population of Las Galeras is mostly Dominican, although like most of Dominican towns and cities in the country there is a big percentage of Haitian citizens. Most of the remaining population is French, Italian, North-American, Canadian, English, Argentinian, Belgian, Swiss, some Bulgarians and other minorities. Most foreigners (excluding Haitians) live near the coast, the wealthier part of town.

Economy
The most important economic activities of the province are agriculture, fishing and tourism.

Tourism

The region is famous for its beautiful palm beaches. There is a beach at the seafront of Las Galeras itself called Playa Grande, as well as a white sand beach called Javo Beach La Playita which is the main destination for local foreigners, and it is within walking distance from town. Boat tours to Rincon Beach, Fronton Beach and Madama Beach are available from the Las Galeras main beach Playa Grande with Madama Beach and Fronton Beach also being big hiking destinations. There are also nearby must-see places such as El Cabito Restaurant/Bar/Treehouse/Hotel which is on a cliff from which people enjoy jumping into the deep and crystal clear ocean. Another place known for its beautiful view is restaurant Monte Azul.

In recent years Las Galeras has been a popular destination for backpackers and travelers in general due to its remote beaches, the possibility of camping and hiking and the fact that it is literally on the end of the road of the peninsula. Humpback whales season is the high season with most tourists visiting from the month of January until mid April. The small town of Las Galeras on the Samana peninsula has a variety of big and small hotels. The largest is called Amhsa Marina, which is an all-inclusive resort and the only one in the area, and there are also smaller places like Villa Serena, La Isleta, Plaza Lusitania, Bungalows of Las Galeras, Todo Blanco, El Pequeno Refugio, Chalet Tropical and more.

There is also a wide variety of vacation lodgings for rent ranging from simple rooms to upscale sea front villas.

There are 3 scuba diving spots currently in the area. Las Galeras Divers, The Dive Academy, and Scuba Libre.

Most of the restaurants are found on the main road, including La Aventure, Denise, Roma, la Bodeguita and El Pescador being the main ones.

Although Las Galeras is not a major nightlife destination, there are some nice places to visit. Bars such as El Pequeno Refugio, La Aventure, La Bodeguita, le BDM and more are always active. Seasonal roadside bars are also popular. Nightclubs are also found... Coco Loco The Club or Universe Drink are weekend destinations.

See also
Samana Province

References

Populated places in Samaná Province
Municipalities of the Dominican Republic